Aside from its generic use as the generic adjective ergodic, ergodic may relate to:
 Ergodicity, mathematical description of a dynamical system which, broadly speaking, has the same behavior averaged over time as averaged over the space of all the system's states (phase space)
 Ergodic hypothesis, a postulate of thermodynamics
 Ergodic theory, a branch of mathematics
 Ergodic literature, literature that requires special effort to navigate
 Ergodic process, a particular type of stochastic processes